Daemak (also Romanized as Dā’emak; also known as Da’em and Dāyūmk) is a village in Mardehek Rural District, Jebalbarez-e Jonubi District, Anbarabad County, Kerman Province, Iran. At the 2006 census, its population was 496, in 106 families.

References 

Populated places in Anbarabad County